Lolo Arziki (born February 5, 1992) is a Cape Verdean documentary filmmaker and LGBT rights activist.

Biography 

Arziki was born on the island of Maio and moved to Portugal at the age of 13. They currently live between Portugal and Luxembourg. They graduated in film at the Polytechnic Institute of Tomar and completed a Master's degree in aesthetics and artistic studies at the Faculty of Social and Human Sciences at the New University of Lisbon.

As a black feminist, their work explores themes such as sexuality, blackness and gender. Arziki also advocates for the legal prohibition of homophobia in Cape Verde, where homosexuality only ceased to be a crime in 2004.

Arziki is non-binary.

Filmography

As director 

 Homestay (2016)
 Relatos de uma Rapariga Nada Púdica (2016)
 Sakudi (2020)

Accolades 

 Homestay:
 2017: Prémio Revelação Nacional, Plateau International Film Festival - Praia, Cape Verde
 2017: ''Prémio Estreia Mundial Televisão', Avanca Film Festival - Portugal

References 

1992 births
Living people
Cape Verdean film directors
LGBT film directors
Cape Verdean LGBT people
Non-binary artists
Non-binary activists